Lac de la Plaine is a lake on the border of the departments Meurthe-et-Moselle and Vosges, Grand Est, France.

Plaine
Landforms of Meurthe-et-Moselle
Landforms of Vosges (department)